North St Marys is a suburb in western Sydney, in the state of New South Wales Australia. North St Marys is located 47 kilometres west of the Sydney central business district, in the local government area of the City of Penrith. North St Marys is an extension of the adjoining suburb of St Marys.

History

Aboriginal culture
Prior to European settlement, what is now North St Marys was home to the Gomerrigal-Tongarra people who spoke the Darug language. They lived a hunter-gatherer lifestyle governed by traditional laws, which had their origins in the Dreamtime. Their homes were bark huts called 'gunyahs'. They hunted kangaroos and emus for meat, and gathered yams, berries and other native plants. Little else is known of their customs and there are no known carvings or rock paintings in the area. By 1816, their numbers had been reduced by smallpox and clashes with the British settlers.

European settlement
The first land grant in the area was made in 1820 to Phillip Parker King, son of the Governor Phillip Gidley King. He named it Triangle Farm but did very little with the land and it remained largely vacant land until the 1940s when it was bought by the Commonwealth Government to house workers at the St Marys munitions factory.

Population

Demographics
According to the 2016 census of Population, there were 3,921 people in North St Marys.
 Aboriginal and Torres Strait Islander people made up 8.6% of the population. 
 69.3% of people were born in Australia. The next most common countries of birth were New Zealand 3.7% and the Philippines 2.7%.   
 73.3% of people spoke only English at home. 
 The most common responses for religion were Catholic 28.8%, No Religion 24.0% and Anglican 17.4%.

Governance
At a local government level, North St Marys is part of the east ward of Penrith City Council, represented by Prue Car, Greg Davies, Maurice Girotto, Jackie Greenow and Tricia Hitchen. At the state level, it is part of the Electoral district of Londonderry, represented by Prue Car of the Australian Labor Party. Federally, it is part of the Division of Lindsay, represented by Liberal's Fiona Scott.

References

External links
 Penrith Local Suburb Profiles

Suburbs of Sydney
City of Penrith